Abu Idris al-Wathiq (died 1269), known as Abu Dabbus, was the last Almohad caliph who reigned in Marrakesh from 1266 until his death.

Life 
Marrakech had been besieged earlier by the Marinid sultan Abu Yusuf Yaqub ibn Abd Al-Haqq before 1266, although unsuccessfully. Idris took advantage of the confused situation to oust his cousin Abu Hafs Umar al-Murtada with Abu Yusuf's support, and to declare himself Almohad caliph, although his power barely extended outside the city. However, the Marinid ruler changed his mind eventually, spurring the Zayyanid Yaghmurasen Ibn Zyan to attack Marrakech. The siege lasted from 1268 until September 1269, when the city fell. Idris al-Wathiq was captured by the combined Marinid-Zayyanid forces and executed.

Idris' death marked the end of the Almohad Caliphate.

Sources
 Julien, Charles-André. Histoire de l'Afrique du Nord, des origines à 1830, Payot, Paris, 1994.

1269 deaths
13th century in Morocco
13th-century Almohad caliphs
Year of birth unknown
People from Marrakesh
Assassinated royalty
13th-century Berber people